Blair Stewart may refer to:

 Blair Stewart (ice hockey) (born 1953), Canadian ice hockey player
 Blair Stewart (rugby union) (born 1983), New Zealand rugby union player
 Blair Stewart-Wilson (1929–2011), equerry to Her Majesty the Queen